Chiara Scholl was the defending champion, but chose not to participate.

Xu Shilin won the title, defeating Paula Ormaechea in the final, 7–5, 6–3.

Seeds

Draw

Finals

Top half

Bottom half

References
Main Draw

Copa LP Chile Hacienda Chicureo - Singles